Courtney Wayment-Smith (born August 4, 1998), who competes under her maiden name, is an American athlete who specializes in the 3000 m steeplechase.

Wayment is from Layton, Utah, and a 2016 graduate of Davis High School. She attended Brigham Young University following high school. In 2022, Wayment ran at the World Athletics Championships in Eugene, Oregon, United States finishing 12th in 9:22.37.

Career

International and professional 
Wayment has made one Team USA senior national team. In 2022, Wayment ran at the World Athletics Championships in Eugene, Oregon, United States finishing 12th in 9:22.37.

Collegiate 
Wayment is a four-time NCAA Division 1 champion, eight-time All-American, and three-time first team All West Coast Conference selection.

High school 
Wayment won the 2015 Utah state cross country meet and was Gatorade Player of the Year.

Wayment graduated from Davis High School (Utah) in 2016 as a 2016 high school All-American mile honoree, three-time UHSAA state champion, and 16-time UHSAA state finalist with high school personal best times of 2:15.57 (800 meters), 4:56.94 (1609 meters), and 10:53.58 (3200 meters).

References

External links
Courtney Wayment at the USA Track & Field
Courtney Wayment at World Athletics

1998 births
Living people
American female middle-distance runners
American female steeplechase runners
Brigham Young University alumni
BYU Cougars women's track and field athletes
BYU Cougars women's cross country runners
People from Layton, Utah
Track and field athletes from Utah
World Athletics Championships athletes for the United States
Sportspeople from Utah